Daffin Theodore "Swede" Backstrom (July 17, 1916 – July 15, 1993) was an American football, basketball and baseball player and coach.

Playing career

Drew University
Backstrom played college baseball and basketball at Drew University in Madison, New Jersey, where he is a member of the schools Athletic Hall of Fame.

Minor league baseball
Backstrom played in minor league baseball as a pitcher.  In 1940 he was with the Akron Yankees in the Middle Atlantic League.  Later that year and also in 1941 he played for Amsterdam Rugmakers in the Canadian–American League.

Coaching career

Drew University
After graduating from Drew University and spending some time in the private sector, Backstrom returned to Drew to first be the assistant and later head baseball coach.

Kansas Wesleyan
Backstrom was the 14th head football coach at Kansas Wesleyan University in Salina, Kansas, serving for the 1962 season.  His coaching record at Kansas Wesleyan was 1–7–1 (.167).

While at Kansas Wesleyan, Backstrom taught classes for the history department. In 1996, the school inducted him into their "Athletic Hall of Fame" for his coaching success.  He was active as a coach and or administrator at the school from 1954 through 1963.

Head coaching record

Football

References

External links
 An Evaluation of the Cocurricular Activity Program at Kansas Wesleyan University by Daffin Backstro
 
 

1916 births
1993 deaths
American men's basketball players
Baseball pitchers
Akron Yankees players
Amsterdam Rugmakers players
Drew Rangers baseball coaches
Drew Rangers baseball players
Drew Rangers men's basketball players
Kansas Wesleyan Coyotes football coaches
Kansas Wesleyan Coyotes men's basketball coaches
Sportspeople from Manhattan
Baseball players from New York City
Basketball players from New York City